Albert Dakin (1873–1964) was a New Zealand cricketer. He played in one first-class match for Canterbury in 1905/06.

See also
 List of Canterbury representative cricketers

References

External links
 

1873 births
1964 deaths
New Zealand cricketers
Canterbury cricketers
Cricketers from Melbourne
Australian emigrants to New Zealand